Legislative elections in France were held on 11 and 18 June 2017 (with different dates for voters overseas) to elect the 577 members of the 15th National Assembly of the Fifth Republic. They followed the two-round presidential election won by Emmanuel Macron. The centrist party he founded in 2016, La République En Marche! (LREM), led an alliance with the centrist Democratic Movement (MoDem); together, the two parties won 350 of the 577 seats—a substantial majority—in the National Assembly, including an outright majority of 308 seats for LREM. The Socialist Party (PS) was reduced to 30 seats and the Republicans (LR) reduced to 112 seats, and both parties' allies also suffered from a marked drop in support; these were the lowest-ever scores for the centre-left and centre-right in the legislative elections. The movement founded by Jean-Luc Mélenchon, la France Insoumise (FI), secured 17 seats, enough for a group in the National Assembly. Among other major parties, the French Communist Party (PCF) secured ten and the National Front (FN) obtained eight seats. Both rounds of the legislative election were marked by record low turnout. 

In total, 206 MPs lost reelection, and 424 (75%) elected MPs were new members. There was a record number of women elected. The average age of parliamentarians decreased from 54 to 48. Ludovic Pajot from the National Rally became the new Baby of the House, being elected at the age of 23. Édouard Philippe, appointed as Prime Minister by Macron following his victory in the presidential election, was reappointed following the second round of the legislative elections and presented his second government by 21 June. The 15th legislature of the French Fifth Republic commenced on 27 June.

Background 

In France, the legislative election takes place about a month after the second round of the presidential election, held on 7 May. Prior to 2002, the presidential and legislative elections were not always held in the same year; following the victory of the UMP in the 2002 legislative elections, the two were synchronized to minimize the risk of cohabitation.

In the first round of the presidential election, on 23 April, Emmanuel Macron of En Marche! and Marine Le Pen of the National Front (FN) advanced to the runoff after placing first and second, respectively, and were followed closely by François Fillon of the Republicans (LR) and Jean-Luc Mélenchon of la France Insoumise (FI). In the first round, Macron led in 240 constituencies, against 216 for Le Pen, 67 for Mélenchon, and 54 for Fillon.

Macron won the second round on 7 May against Le Pen, securing 66.1% of valid votes.

Upon the close of nominations for the legislative election, the Ministry of the Interior published a final list on 23 May containing a total of 7,882 candidates, with an average of 14 candidates within each constituency.

The 2017 legislative election was the first held after the legal abolition of the dual mandate in France in 2014; deputies will no longer be allowed to concurrently serve in local government, frequently as mayors, upon election to the National Assembly.

Electoral system 
The 577 members of the National Assembly are elected using a two-round system with single-member constituencies. Candidates for the legislative elections had five days, from Monday 15 May to 18:00 on Friday 19 May, to declare and register their candidacy. The official campaign ran from 22 May to 10 June at midnight, while the campaign for the second round runs from 12 June at midnight to 17 June at midnight, with eligible candidates required to declare their presence by 18:00 CEST on 13 June. 
To be elected in the first round, a candidate was required to secure an absolute majority of votes cast, and also to secure votes equal to at least 25% of eligible voters in their constituency. Should none of the candidates satisfy these conditions, a second round of voting ensues. Only first-round candidates with the support of at least 12.5% of eligible voters are allowed to participate, but if only 1 candidate meets that standard the two candidates with the highest number of votes in the first round may continue to the second round. In the 2017 election, four deputies were elected in the first round. In the second round, the candidate with a plurality is elected. Of the 577 constituencies, 539 are in metropolitan France, 27 are in overseas departments and territories and 11 are for French citizens living abroad.

Voting in the first round took place from 08:00 to 18:00 (local time) on Saturday 3 June in French Polynesia and at French diplomatic missions in the Americas, and on Sunday 4 June at French diplomatic missions outside the Americas. Voting in the French overseas departments and territories in the Americas (i.e. French Guiana, Guadeloupe, Martinique, Saint Barthélemy, Saint Martin, and Saint Pierre and Miquelon) took place from 08:00 to 18:00 (local time) on Saturday 10 June. Voting in metropolitan France (as well as the French overseas departments and territories of Mayotte, New Caledonia, Réunion and Wallis and Futuna) took place from 08:00 to 18:00 or 20:00 (local time) on Sunday 11 June.

Voting in the second round took place on Saturday 17 June from 08:00 to 18:00 (local time) in the French overseas departments and territories situated east of the International Date Line and west of metropolitan France (i.e. French Guiana, French Polynesia, Guadeloupe, Martinique, Saint Barthélemy, Saint Martin and Saint Pierre and Miquelon), as well as at French diplomatic missions in the Americas. Voting in metropolitan France (as well as the French overseas departments and territories of Mayotte, New Caledonia, Réunion and Wallis and Futuna, and French diplomatic missions outside the Americas) takes place from 08:00 to 18:00 or 20:00 (local time) on Sunday 18 June.

The 15th National Assembly convened on 27 June at 15:00 CEST.

Parties

Summary

La République En Marche! and MoDem 

En Marche!, the movement founded by Emmanuel Macron, who won the presidential election under its banner, planned to run candidates in all 577 constituencies under the banner of "La République En Marche!", of which at least half were planned to be from civil society – the other half having previously held political office – and half women. No "double investiture" was permitted, though the original requirement of prospective candidates to leave their previous political party was waived by Macron on 5 May. In addition to those parameters, he specified in his initial press conference on 19 January that he would require that candidates demonstrate "probity" (disqualifying any prospective candidates with a criminal record), "political plurality" (representing the threads of the movement), and "efficacy". Those wishing to seek the investiture of En Marche! were required to sign up online, and the movement received nearly 15,000 applications by late April. For nominations sought by those in the political world, the popularity, establishment, and ability to appear in the media of applicants are also considered, with the most difficult cases adjudicated by Macron himself. To represent themselves under the label of La République En Marche!, however, outgoing deputies must decide to leave the Socialist Party (PS) or the Republicans (LR).

After his victory in the presidential election, Macron resigned his post as president of En Marche!, with Catherine Barbaroux appointed as interim president. The movement, renamed, presented candidates under the label of "La République En Marche!"; though the full list of 577 investitures was to be published on 11 May, Jean-Paul Delevoye, president of the investiture commission, later indicated that the total published that day would be "about 450". The delay was attributed to an influx of applications following Macron's victory in the presidential election – more than a thousand, bringing the total to over 16,000 – with additional complexity arising from the interest of former Prime Minister Manuel Valls in standing as a La République En Marche! candidate without either submitting an application or leaving the Socialist Party. Since the announcement that "La République En Marche!" would be transformed into a formal political party, however, the conditions of securing an investiture tightened considerably, with candidates expected to be "administratively" attached to the party to prevent public funding (distributed on the basis of electoral results) from being received by the PS or the Republicans.

The initial list of 428 investitures was revealed on 11 May, with exact gender parity (214 men and 214 women), with 94% of candidates not outgoing deputies; 93% employed, 2% looking for work, 4% retired, 1% students; 52% from civil society; an average age of 46 (the youngest being 24 and oldest being 62), compared to 60 for outgoing deputies; and 24 current deputies, mostly Socialists, invested under the label of La République En Marche! The total number of remaining investitures to be concluded is 148. No candidate was invested against Valls. Numerous candidates were invested in error, including Mourad Boudjellal, François Pupponi, and Augustin Augier, who did not apply; Stéphane Saint-André, an outgoing PRG deputy who renounced his investiture and raised concerns about the potential appointment of Édouard Philippe as prime minister; and Thierry Robert, an outgoing deputy who contravened the requirement of not having a criminal history.

The list was further updated on 15 May with an additional 83 candidates, of which half were proposed by the MoDem, bringing the overall total to 511, and leaving 66 constituencies to be decided, of which about 30 are reserved for figures on the right and left who expressed support for Macron's project and most of the rest constituencies for overseas departments; ultimately, 51 constituencies with outgoing deputies on both the left and right considered "Macron-compatible" were not contested; Delevoye stated that some twenty constituencies for overseas France were frozen due to local party financing peculiarities, with other vacated constituencies for other political personalities apparently interested in joining in the presidential majority.

On 15 May, Édouard Philippe, a deputy of the Republicans, was appointed as Prime Minister. After the selection of ministers to the newly formed government on 17 May, the movement announced that it would not invest candidates in 56 constituencies, hoping to protect a number of those on the left and right who had expressed support but not rallied, with the possibility of adjustments before the deadline on 19 May. Appointed ministers contesting the legislative elections were obligated to resign if not elected: namely, Christophe Castaner, Marielle de Sarnez, Richard Ferrand, Annick Girardin, Bruno Le Maire, and Mounir Mahjoubi; all six were eventually elected.

MoDem 

After François Bayrou endorsed Macron in February, the Democratic Movement (MoDem), which he leads, was reportedly to receive 90 constituencies, of which 50 were considered winnable, for its candidates. However, hours of the publication of the initial list, Bayrou indicated that it did not have the "approval" of the MoDem, unsatisfied with the number of constituencies for MoDem candidates, and appealed to Macron to permit joint investitures and planned to convene the political bureau of his party on 12 May. He was also unhappy with what he called a "recycling operation of the PS"; according to a tally by MoDem officials, among the 428 investitures announced, 153 were granted to PS/ex-PS/PRG, 38 to the MoDem, 25 to LR or miscellaneous right, 15 to UDI/ex-UDI, and 197 to civil society figures. On 12 May, Bayrou announced that he had secured a "solid and balanced" draft agreement, claiming that his party would ultimately obtain a bit more than a hundred investitures. A MoDem candidate replaced Gaspard Gantzer, former communications advisor to Hollande, in Ille-et-Vilaine's 2nd constituency after fierce objections by local activists and his renunciation of the investiture, which he claimed he did not apply for, and mayor of Mont-de-Marsan Geneviève Darrieussecq and Senator Leila Aïchi, both members of the MoDem executive bureau, received investitures.

Bayrou's party hopes to elect at least 15 deputies, necessary for the formation of a parliamentary group in the National Assembly; additionally, to be reimbursed for expenses, the party must receive at least 1% of the vote in at least 50 constituencies where it is present. Public financing is also allocated as a function of the number of elected officials, hence the ambitions of the MoDem.

The Republicans (LR) and UDI 

On 2 May, François Baroin was appointed by the political bureau of the Republicans (LR) to head the campaign for the legislative elections. A week before, he said that he would be available to serve as Prime Minister in a cohabitation government under Emmanuel Macron and considered it impossible not to run on the same program as its defeated presidential candidate François Fillon, who was eliminated in the first round of the presidential election, in the legislative elections. Baroin has indicated pessimism with regard to the prospects of the Republicans in the legislative elections, saying "At 150 [seats] is good. From 100 to 150 is not bad. Below 100 is a failure." The platform of the Republicans for the legislative election, published on 10 May, breaks with that of its defeated Fillon, who was eliminated in the first round, on several points. Though it preserved the plans to eliminate the 35-hour workweek and reform to the solidarity tax on wealth (ISF) on which he campaigned, it differed on terrorism, immigration, family, and European policy. The party ran in alliance with the Union of Democrats and Independents (UDI), whose executive bureau on 7 March approved an accord with the Republicans reserving them 96 constituencies, including the 28 seats currently held by outgoing deputies, and preparing primaries in 42 constituencies between UDI and LR candidates.

On 15 May, some 173 LR and UDI elected officials and personalities, including Jean-Louis Borloo, Nathalie Kosciusko-Morizet, Christian Estrosi, and Thierry Solère, appealed to their fellows to "respond to the hand extended by the president", after which the Republicans published a counter-appeal, insisting that "France needs more than ever a majority of the right and centre in the National Assembly".

On 20 May, Baroin launched the campaign of the Republicans at the Bois de Vincennes, determined to impose cohabitation upon Macron and provide him with the "majority needed by France", a goal complicated by the inclusion of LR personalities in the formation the cabinet, and principally by the selection of Édouard Philippe as Prime Minister. In his speech, Baroin made his case for a "majority without ambiguity, without pretense. A real majority and not a majority of circumstances, meetings, and personal ambitions", describing the legislative elections before an audience of nearly 2,000 as "the mother of battles". Meanwhile, the appointment of three LR personalities as ministers in the government – Édouard Philippe, Bruno Le Maire, and Gérald Darmanin – in its attempt at a recomposition of politics infringed upon the space occupied by the party. Emphasizing that many mobilized merely against Le Pen and not for Macron, he wielded the party's program, borrowing elements from that of Fillon's.

National Front (FN) 

The National Front (FN), led by Marine Le Pen, ended its pre-investitures for the legislative elections in December 2016. The average age of the candidates is 47 years, with near-gender parity and almost 80% of candidates already having a local mandate (i.e., within a municipal, departmental, or regional council), compared to a rate of barely 10% in 2012. Some 50 constituencies were planned to be possibly contested by joint candidacies with Debout la France (DLF) following the rallying of Nicolas Dupont-Aignan to Le Pen after the second round of the presidential election, but on 14 May the FN announced the suspension of the agreement, intending to invest candidates in all 577 constituencies as a result, reversing the "principle of accord" on joint investitures that had been agreed upon earlier. The FN ran a candidate against Dupont-Aignan, the sitting deputy for Essonne's 8th constituency. Outgoing deputy Marion Maréchal-Le Pen announced her intention to leave politics on 9 May, and as such did not run in the legislative elections.

Among the list of 553 candidates already invested by the FN include Florian Philippot in Moselle's 6th, Gilbert Collard in Gard's 2nd, Stéphane Ravier in Bouches-du-Rhône's 3rd, Wallerand de Saint-Just in Paris's 13th, and Sophie Montel in Doubs's 4th. Of the 553 candidates in the initial list, 86% are candidates not previously invested in 2012, with nearly 70% holding at least one elected office. The expulsion of Jean-Marie Le Pen from the party in August 2015 was followed by the departure of a number of his companions, who as a result were not invested as candidates. A number of mayors elected in the 2014 municipal elections chose not to stand in order to retain their local mandates, including Julien Sanchez in Beaucaire, Franck Briffaut in Villers-Cotterêts, and David Rachline in Fréjus. The alliance with the small party of Paul-Marie Coûteaux, Souveraineté, identité et libertés (SIEL), was broken in 2016; the party in 2012 provided 34 of the candidates invested by the FN.

Le Pen herself was reluctant to introduce herself as a candidate after her defeat in the presidential election, with initial hopes of 80 to 100 deputies within the FN revised sharply downwards to 15 target constituencies. On 18 May, she confirmed that she would once again run in Pas-de-Calais's 11th constituency (where she lost by a hundred votes to Philippe Kemel in 2012), which includes Hénin-Beaumont (whose mayor is Steeve Briois of the FN) and where she received 58.2% of votes in the second round of the presidential election. Following the announcement, her father Jean-Marie Le Pen decided not to present a candidate under the banner of the "Union of Patriots", an alliance of far-right movements presenting 200 candidates across France, in the constituency.

Following the victory of Macron in the presidential election, Le Pen stated that she did not deem the proposed reform of the labour code as a priority, criticizing the planned usage of ordonnances as a coup de force and believing that amending it to allow greater flexibility was nothing more than a demand of large employers. She also further critiqued the plans as the El Khomri law "times a thousand", but calling not for demonstrations on the streets but a vote for the FN.

La France Insoumise (FI) 

La France Insoumise, the political movement launched by Jean-Luc Mélenchon, former co-president of the Left Party (PG) who ran as a presidential candidate in both 2012 and 2017, intended to run candidates in all 577 constituencies. In a list of 410 investitures published in mid-February, gender parity was maintained, 60% of candidates came from civil society, and the average age was only 43 years, with the youngest at 19 years old. Candidates were selected after the national committee reviewed online applications of prospects.

The constituencies contested by the movement included some held or contested by members of the French Communist Party (PCF). Relations deteriorated between the two, and in early May la France Insoumise proposed that the groupings withdraw competing candidacies in 26 constituencies. However, on 9 May, campaign spokesman Manuel Bompard said that there would be no accord between the two parties in the legislative elections and blamed the PCF for the failure to reach an agreement.

On 11 May, Mélenchon announced that he would stand as a candidate in Bouches-du-Rhône's 4th constituency in a letter addressed to the adherents of his movement in Marseille, where the riding is located; he came first in the city during the first round of the presidential election, with almost 25% of the vote, and in the constituency he received 39.09%, far ahead of both Macron and Le Pen and one of his best scores nationally. The constituency was then held by Socialist deputy Patrick Mennucci, considered a "friend" by Mélenchon himself.

Socialist Party (PS) and allies 

The first wave of 395 Socialist candidates for the legislative elections was invested on 17 December 2016, including a number who supported of the candidacy of Emmanuel Macron in the presidential election, such as Alain Calmette in Cantal's 1st, Olivier Véran in Isère's 1st, Jean-Louis Touraine in Rhône's 3rd, Corinne Erhel in Côtes-d'Armor's 5th, Richard Ferrand in Finistère's 6th, Jean-Jacques Bridey in Val-de-Marne's 7th, Stéphane Travert in Manche's 3rd, and Christophe Castaner in Alpes-de-Haute-Provence's 2nd constituency. Of the outgoing deputies invested by La République En Marche!, Frédéric Barbier, deputy for Doubs's 4th constituency, was the only one to also remain invested by the PS; Christophe Borgel, national secretary of elections for the Socialist Party, stated that Barbier would retain his investiture as he was the "best to fight the National Front".

The party presented its own candidates in more than 400 constituencies, with the rest reserved for its allies Europe Ecology – The Greens (EELV), the Union of Democrats and Ecologists (UDE), and the Radical Party of the Left (PRG). First Secretary Jean-Christophe Cambadélis also indicated that the PS hoped to open discussions with la France Insoumise and En Marche! for agreements in constituencies where Le Pen obtained more than 60 percent of the vote in the second round of the presidential election, as well as in ridings in which the second round of the legislative elections could foreseeably be fought between the right and the FN.

On 9 May, the national bureau of the Socialist Party approved its three-page platform for the legislative elections entitled "a clear contract for France, a constructive and solidary left". It abandoned many of the proposals of its defeated presidential candidate Benoît Hamon and drew a number of red lines with regard to the program of Emmanuel Macron, refusing to allow the reform of the labour code by ordonnance and abolition of the solidarity tax on wealth (ISF) on non-property assets. Former Prime Minister Bernard Cazeneuve led the campaign for the legislative elections.

Hamon himself chose to support candidates running against prominent reformists invested by the Socialist Party, backing Michel Nouaille of the French Communist Party (PCF) against former Prime Minister Manuel Valls, whom he defeated in the presidential primary; the feminist Caroline de Haas of EELV/PCF against Myriam El Khomri, namesake of her labour law; Philippe Rio of the PCF against Malek Boutih, a Socialist running under the banner of the presidential majority (having been denied an investiture) who violently denounced Hamon as a candidate who would "resonate with a fringe Islamic-leftist"; and Salah Amokrane of the EELV against Gérard Bapt, who made a controversial trip to Syria with three other parliamentarians in 2015.

In an interview on 22 May, Cambadélis envisaged a potential renaming of the PS, stating that the party should "refound, reformulate, and restructure" to respond to the demand for the "renewal, social justice and ecology", after previously resisting the idea in 2014 when the possibility was mentioned by Valls while Prime Minister.

Europe Ecology – The Greens (EELV) 
In exchange for the withdrawal of ecologist candidate Yannick Jadot in the presidential election in favor of Socialist candidate Benoît Hamon in February, the PS agreed to reserve 42 constituencies for the EELV (including all those of its outgoing deputies), and the accord was formally approved by EELV on 19 April. The agreement also provided that the EELV did not present candidates in 53 constituencies. The investiture of former housing minister Cécile Duflot was maintained despite the opposition of mayor of Paris Anne Hidalgo, as was that of Sergio Coronado, who supported Jean-Luc Mélenchon in the presidential election; however, he nevertheless faced a Socialist candidate in the legislative elections. Many of the remaining constituencies are those of Socialist deputies who backed Emmanuel Macron in the presidential election.

On 15 May, the EELV revealed its list of candidates for the legislative elections, investing 459 candidates (228 men and 231 women) and supporting 52 Socialists, 16 Communists, and François Ruffin under the banner of la France Insoumise. From the ranks of the party's leaders, national secretary David Cormand presented himself in Seine-Maritime's 4th, deputy national secretary Sandrine Rousseau in Pas-de-Calais's 9th, and spokesperson Julien Bayou in Paris's 5th.

French Communist Party (PCF) 
Though the French Communist Party (PCF) formally supported the candidacy of Jean-Luc Mélenchon in the presidential election, it still ran its own candidates in the legislative elections. After Mélenchon's defeat in the first round of the presidential election, Pierre Laurent once again called for an alliance with la France Insoumise. Negotiations between the two failed to produce an agreement, and on 9 May la France Insoumise announced that it would continue on in the legislative elections without allying with the PCF. PCF candidates who sponsored the candidacy of Mélenchon in the presidential election did not face any opposing candidate from la France Insoumise. The PCF and FI were face-to-face in almost all constituencies, with the PCF planning to invest 535 candidates and FI almost as many, though the possibility of a withdrawal from 20 or so constituencies remained. On 16 May, the PCF published a list of 484 candidates invested in the legislative elections, refraining from appearing in a number of constituencies in favor of candidates from la France Insoumise, EELV, PS, or Ensemble! (Clémentine Autain). According to the PCF, 40% of its candidates were younger than 50, and 20% younger than 40, with an average age of 51; a quarter were retired, 26% employees, 20% civil servants, and 7% manual workers. PCF candidates campaigned under the label of "PCF–Front de Gauche".

Debout la France (DLF) 
Debout la France (Arise France; abbreviated as DLF), led by former presidential candidate Nicolas Dupont-Aignan, intended to present candidates in all 577 constituencies; despite Dupont-Aignan's support of Le Pen in the second round, he reiterated that DLF candidates would face those of the FN, and the national council of Debout la France stated on 13 May that it would invest candidates in almost all constituencies, negotiations with the FN having failed upon the issue of joint investitures.

Others 
Lutte Ouvrière (Workers' Struggle; abbreviated as LO) presented candidates in 553 constituencies, with 539 in metropolitan France, six in Réunion, four in Martinique, and four in Guadeloupe; presidential candidate Nathalie Arthaud contested Seine-Saint-Denis's 6th constituency, where she received 3% in the 2012 legislative elections. In terms of financing, the party accumulated some €2 million to cover costs. The New Anticapitalist Party (NPA) was unlikely to present candidates in the legislative elections due to the potentially high cost for the party, as campaign expenses are reimbursed only if a party's candidates attain 1% in at least 50 constituencies. Mouvement 100%, a coalition of 28 parties, including the Independent Ecological Alliance (AEI), planned to present candidates in all 577 constituencies. The Popular Republican Union (UPR) of François Asselineau planned to present candidates in all 577 constituencies, with 574 ultimately invested.

Alliance Royale (AR) presented candidates in 20 constituencies.

Opinion polls

Results

National results 
|- style="background-color:#E9E9E9;text-align:center;"
|-
| colspan="12" | 
|-
! style="text-align:left;" colspan="4" rowspan="2"| Parties and coalitions
! colspan="3"| First round
! colspan="3"| Second round
! colspan="3"| Total
|- style="background-color:#E9E9E9;text-align:center;"
! width="75"|Votes
! width="30"|%
! width="30"|Seats
! width="75"|Votes
! width="30"|%
! width="30"|Seats
! width="30"|Seats
! width="30"|%
|-
| style="background-color:#FFED99;border-bottom-style:hidden;" rowspan="2"|
| style="background-color:;"|
| style="text-align:left;"| La République En Marche!
| LREM
| 
| 28.21
| 2
| 
| 43.06
| 306
| 308
| 53.38
|-
| style="background-color:;"|
| style="text-align:left;"| Democratic Movement
| MoDem
| 
| 4.12
| 0
| 
| 6.06
| 42
| 42
| 7.28
|- style="background-color:#FFED99;"
| style="text-align:left;" colspan="4"| Presidential majority (centre)
| 
| 32.33
| 2
| 
| 49.11
| 348
| 350
| 60.66
|-
| style="background-color:#B9DAFF;border-bottom-style:hidden;" rowspan="3"|
| style="background-color:;"|
| style="text-align:left;"| The Republicans
| LR
| 
| 15.77
| 0
| 
| 22.23
| 112
| 112
| 19.41
|-
| style="background-color:;"|
| style="text-align:left;"| Union of Democrats and Independents
| UDI
| 
| 3.03
| 1
| 
| 3.04
| 17
| 18
| 3.12
|-
| style="background-color:;"|
| style="text-align:left;"| Miscellaneous right
| DVD
| 
| 2.76
| 0
| 
| 1.68
| 6
| 6
| 1.04
|- style="background-color:#B9DAFF;"
| style="text-align:left;" colspan="4"| Parliamentary right
| 
| 21.57
| 1
| 
| 26.95
| 135
| 136
| 23.57
|-
| style="background-color:#FFC6D5;border-bottom-style:hidden;" rowspan="3"|
| style="background-color:;"|
| style="text-align:left;"| Socialist Party
| PS
| 
| 7.44
| 0
| 
| 5.68
| 30
| 30
| 5.20
|-
| style="background-color:;"|
| style="text-align:left;"| Miscellaneous left
| DVG
| 
| 1.60
| 1
| 
| 1.45
| 11
| 12
| 2.08
|-
| style="background-color:;"|
| style="text-align:left;"| Radical Party of the Left
| PRG
| 
| 0.47
| 0
| 
| 0.36
| 3
| 3
| 0.52
|- style="background-color:#FFC6D5;"
| style="text-align:left;" colspan="4"| Parliamentary left
| 
| 9.51
| 1
| 
| 7.49
| 44
| 45
| 7.80
|-
| style="background-color:;"|
| style="text-align:left;" colspan="2"| La France Insoumise
| FI
| 
| 11.03
| 0
| 
| 4.86
| 17
| 17
| 2.95
|-
| style="background-color:;"|
| style="text-align:left;" colspan="2"| French Communist Party
| PCF
| 
| 2.72
| 0
| 
| 1.20
| 10
| 10
| 1.73
|-
| style="background-color:;"|
| style="text-align:left;" colspan="2"| National Front
| FN
| 
| 13.20
| 0
| 
| 8.75
| 8
| 8
| 1.39
|-
| style="background-color:#ffcc33;"|
| style="text-align:left;" colspan="2"| Regionalists
| REG
| 
| 0.90
| 0
| 
| 0.76
| 5
| 5
| 0.87
|-
| style="background-color:;"|
| style="text-align:left;" colspan="2"| Miscellaneous
| DIV
| 
| 2.21
| 0
| 
| 0.55
| 3
| 3
| 0.52
|-
| style="background-color:#77ff77;"|
| style="text-align:left;" colspan="2"| Ecologists
| ECO
| 
| 4.30
| 0
| 
| 0.13
| 1
| 1
| 0.17
|-
| style="background-color:;"|
| style="text-align:left;" colspan="2"| Debout la France
| DLF
| 
| 1.17
| 0
| 
| 0.10
| 1
| 1
| 0.17
|-
| style="background-color:#404040;"|
| style="text-align:left;" colspan="2"| Far-right
| EXD
| 
| 0.30
| 0
| 
| 0.10
| 1
| 1
| 0.17
|-
| style="background-color:#bb0000;"|
| style="text-align:left;" colspan="2"| Far-left
| EXG
| 
| 0.77
| 0
| –
| –
| –
| 0
| 0.00
|-
| style="background-color:#E9E9E9;" colspan="12"|
|- style="font-weight:bold;"
| style="text-align:left;" colspan="4"| Total
| 
| 100.00
| 4
| 
| 100.00
| 573
| 577
| 100.00
|-
| style="background-color:#E9E9E9;" colspan="12"|
|-
| style="text-align:left;" colspan="4"| Valid votes
| 
| 97.78
| style="background-color:#E9E9E9;" rowspan="6"|
| 
| 90.14
| style="background-color:#E9E9E9;" colspan="3" rowspan="6"|
|-
| style="text-align:left;" colspan="4"| Blank ballots
| 
| 1.54
| 
| 6.99
|-
| style="text-align:left;" colspan="4"| Null ballots
| 
| 0.67
| 
| 2.87
|-
| style="text-align:left;" colspan="4"| Turnout
| 
| 48.70
| 
| 42.64
|-
| style="text-align:left;" colspan="4"| Abstentions
| 
| 51.30
| 
| 57.36
|-
| style="text-align:left;" colspan="4"| Registered voters
| 
| style="background-color:#E9E9E9;"|
| 
| style="background-color:#E9E9E9;"|
|-
| style="background-color:#E9E9E9;" colspan="12"|
|-
| style="text-align:left;" colspan="12"|
Source: Ministry of the Interior
|}

First round 
Four deputies were elected in the first round: Sylvain Maillard (LREM) in Paris's 1st, Paul Molac (LREM) in Morbihan's 4th, Napole Polutele (DVG) in Wallis and Futuna's 1st, and Stéphane Demilly of the UDI in Somme's 5th constituencies.

In the remaining 573 constituencies, it was determined that there would be 572 two-way contests in the second round, and only one three-way contest (triangulaire), in Aube's 1st constituency, involving LREM, LR, and the FN.

In Aveyron's 2nd constituency, the candidate of the Republicans later withdrew and backed that of LREM.

Electorate 
Because the Ministry of the Interior did not report results separately for EELV, the "total vote" percentage listed below is for all ecologist candidates.

Maps

Second round

Electorate

Maps

Results by constituency

Aftermath 

In the aftermath of the legislative elections, the split between Macron-compatible "constructives" within the Republicans (LR) and the rest of the party re-emerged. On 21 June, Thierry Solère announced the creation of a new common group in the National Assembly with the Union of Democrats and Independents (UDI) likely to contain the 18 UDI deputies and about 15 LR. The formation of two parliamentary groups on the right represented a symbolic divorce to the two threads on the right (the moderates and the hardliners) and the end of the old Union for a Popular Movement (UMP) which had been created in 2002 to unite the right and centre. The French Communist Party (PCF), la France Insoumise (FI), Socialist Party (PS), La République En Marche! (LREM), and Democratic Movement (MoDem) also sought to form separate parliamentary groups.

The legislative elections were followed on 19 June by the conclusion of the Philippe I government by courtesy and reappointment of Édouard Philippe as Prime Minister; though usually a formality, the formation of the Philippe II government was complicated by the ongoing affair regarding alleged improprieties in the employment practices of MoDem officials in the European Parliament and elsewhere. The request of Minister of the Armed Forces Sylvie Goulard to leave the government on 20 June was soon followed by the announcement on 21 June that both Minister of Justice François Bayrou and Minister in charge of European Affairs Marielle de Sarnez would depart the government, the two being the remaining MoDem officials within the government. In the reshuffle, Richard Ferrand, implicated in allegations of nepotism regarding a property sale, was transferred from his post in government as Minister of Territorial Cohesion as planned president of the LREM group in the National Assembly, and likewise for de Sarnez with the newly created MoDem group. Despite these changes, the MoDem remained within the government, with the announcement of the Philippe II government on 21 June. The Socialist group was ultimately refounded as the "New Left" (NG), and Marc Fesneau was elected president of the MoDem group.

Vote of confidence 
In the vote of confidence in the new government on 4 July 2017, 370 voted in favor, 67 opposed, and 129 abstained, representing a record level of abstention and the lowest level of opposition since 1959.

See also 

 List of deputies of the 15th National Assembly of France
 15th legislature of the French Fifth Republic
 2017 French presidential election
 2017 French Senate election

References

External links 

Ministry of the Interior election results 

2017 French legislative election
2017 elections in France
2017
June 2017 events in France